North Coast is one of the nine wards used to elect members of the North Ayrshire council. Created in 2007 as North Coast and Cumbraes and covering Fairlie, Largs, Millport and Skelmorlie along the Firth of Clyde, plus a sparsely-populated area inland covering part of the Clyde Muirshiel Regional Park, it elected four Councillors. It was unaffected by a national boundary review prior to the 2017 local elections, but after the introduction of the Islands (Scotland) Act 2018, North Ayrshire's wards were re-organised for the 2022 election: West Kilbride was added from the previous Dalry and West Kilbride ward (the remaining territory going to the Kilbirnie and Beith ward which was consequently re-named Garnock Valley) along with one extra councillor, and the name was shortened to North Coast – although the Great Cumbrae and Little Cumbrae islands were still included.

Councillors

Election Results

2022 Election
2022 North Ayrshire Council election

Source:
}}</onlyinclude>

2017 Election
2017 North Ayrshire Council election

2012 Election
2012 North Ayrshire Council election

2014 By-election
SNP Cllr Alex McLean died on 1 August 2014. A by-election was held on 30 October 2014 and was won by his widow Grace McLean, also of the SNP.

2007 Election
2007 North Ayrshire Council election

References

Wards of North Ayrshire
Millport, Cumbrae
Largs